Muqshin is a Wilayat of Dhofar in the Sultanate of Oman.

References 

Populated places in Oman